In differential geometry, the associate family (or Bonnet family) of a minimal surface is a one-parameter family of minimal surfaces which share the same Weierstrass data. That is, if the surface has the representation 

the family is described by

where  indicates the real part of a complex number.

For θ = π/2 the surface is called the conjugate of the θ = 0 surface.

The transformation can be viewed as locally rotating the principal curvature directions. The surface normals of a point with a fixed ζ remains unchanged as θ changes; the point itself moves along an ellipse.

Some examples of associate surface families are: the catenoid and helicoid family, the Schwarz P, Schwarz D and gyroid family, and the Scherk's first and second surface family. The Enneper surface is conjugate to itself: it is left invariant as θ changes.

Conjugate surfaces have the property that any straight line on a surface maps to a planar geodesic on its conjugate surface and vice versa. If a patch of one surface is bounded by a straight line, then the conjugate patch is bounded by a planar symmetry line. This is useful for constructing minimal surfaces by going to the conjugate space: being bound by planes is equivalent to being bound by a polygon.

There are counterparts to the associate families of minimal surfaces in higher-dimensional spaces and manifolds.

References

Differential geometry
Minimal surfaces